Northeast Eagles can refer to any of the following ice hockey teams in Canada:

Northeast Jr. Eagles, a junior team in Newfoundland.
Northeast Sr. Eagles, a senior team in Newfoundland.